In mathematics, a Hilbert–Schmidt operator, named after David Hilbert and Erhard Schmidt, is a bounded operator  that acts on a Hilbert space  and has finite Hilbert–Schmidt norm

where  is an orthonormal basis. The index set  need not be countable. However, the sum on the right must contain at most countably many non-zero terms, to have meaning. This definition is independent of the choice of the orthonormal basis. 
In finite-dimensional Euclidean space, the Hilbert–Schmidt norm  is identical to the Frobenius norm.

||·|| is well defined
The Hilbert–Schmidt norm does not depend on the choice of orthonormal basis.

Examples 

An important class of examples is provided by Hilbert–Schmidt integral operators. 
Every bounded operator with a finite-dimensional range (these are called operators of finite rank) is a Hilbert–Schmidt operator. 
The identity operator on a Hilbert space is a Hilbert–Schmidt operator if and only if the Hilbert space is finite-dimensional. 

Space of Hilbert–Schmidt operators 

The product of two Hilbert–Schmidt operators has finite trace-class norm; therefore, if A and B are two Hilbert–Schmidt operators, the Hilbert–Schmidt inner product can be defined as

The norm induced by this inner product is the Hilbert–Schmidt norm under which the space of Hilbert–Schmidt operators is complete (thus making it into a Hilbert space). 
The space of all bounded linear operators of finite rank (i.e. that have a finite-dimensional range) is a dense subset of the space of Hilbert–Schmidt operators (with the Hilbert–Schmidt norm). 

The set of Hilbert–Schmidt operators is closed in the norm topology if, and only if,  is finite-dimensional.

Properties 

 Every Hilbert–Schmidt operator  is a compact operator. 
 A bounded linear operator  is Hilbert–Schmidt if and only if the same is true of the operator , in which case the Hilbert–Schmidt norms of T and |T| are equal. 
 Hilbert–Schmidt operators are nuclear operators of order 2, and are therefore compact operators. 
 If  is a bounded linear operator then we have . 
  is a Hilbert–Schmidt operator if and only if the trace  of the nonnegative self-adjoint operator  is finite, in which case .
In particular, the composition of two Hilbert–Schmidt operators is again Hilbert–Schmidt (and even a trace class operator). 
In Euclidean space,  is also called the Frobenius norm.

See also

References

   
  

Linear operators
Operator theory